The King of Thessalonica was the ruler of the Kingdom of Thessalonica, one of the crusader states founded in Greece in the aftermath of the Fourth Crusade (1202–1204). The King of Thessalonica was not an independent ruler; the Kingdom of Thessalonica was one of several vassal states created by the crusaders, subservient to the new Latin Empire of Constantinople, which had supplanted the Byzantine Empire.

The kingdom proved to be short-lived, with Thessalonica being captured by Theodore Komnenos Doukas of Epirus in 1224, just twenty years after the kingdom had been founded. The last king, Demetrius of Montferrat, escaped into exile and upon his death ceded the title to Frederick II, Holy Roman Emperor, who some years later ceded it back to Demetrius's family. Their line of titular Kings of Thessalonica ended with the marriage of Yolande of Montferrat to Byzantine emperor Andronikos II Palaiologos in 1284, at which point titular ownership of Thessalonica passed back to the Byzantine emperors.

Other lines of titular kings of Thessalonica originated in that Baldwin II, titular Latin Emperor of Constantinople, perceived Frederick II's use of the title as invalid as he was excommunicated and had been denounced as a heretic. At two points, Baldwin granted the title to nobles in Western Europe, first to Hugh IV of Burgundy and then to Philip of Sicily. Claims to the title did not cease until the 1330s, more than a century after the kingdom's fall.

Kings of Thessalonica, 1204–1224

House of Aleramici (1204–1224)

Titular Kings of Thessalonica, 1224–1331

House of Aleramici (1224–1230) 

After Demetrius's death, the succession to the defunct kingdom was contested, with three separate, conflicting, lines of titular 'kings of Thessalonica' forming in the 13th century. Demetrius's own preferred heir was Holy Roman Emperor Frederick II, who he ceded his titles to.

Montferrat line (1230–1284)

House of Hohenstaufen (1230–1239)

House of Aleramici (1239–1284) 

William's daughter Yolande married the Byzantine emperor Andronikos II Palaiologos (1282–1328) in 1284. As her dowry, William abandoned the title 'King of Thessalonica', with his titular claim to the city and region surrounding it returning to its actual owners, the Byzantine Empire.

Burgundian line (1266–1320/1321) 
In 1266, the titular Emperor of Constantinople, Baldwin II, sold the title 'King of Thessalonica' to Hugh IV, Duke of Burgundy. Baldwin considered the rights of the Montferrat line of titular kings to be void as they had been granted the title by Frederick II, who was excommunicated and condemned as a heretic.

House of Burgundy (1266–1320)

House of Bourbon (1320–1320/1321) 

During Louis of Bourbon's purchase of the titles, Philip of Taranto, Angevin pretender to the title, intervened and offered the same sum to purchase them. Through his purchase of the titles, Philip acquired the Burgundian claim to the titles as well, ensuring that there was now only a single line of pretenders. Louis of Bourbon likely only agreed to selling the titles because of the 1321 engagement between Philip's son of the same name and Louis's daughter Beatrice.

Angevin line (1274–1331) 
In the 1267 Treaty of Viterbo, signed by Baldwin II, Charles I of Sicily, and William II Villehardouin, Prince of Achaea, it was agreed that Baldwin's sale of the title 'King of Thessalonica' to Hugh IV of Burgundy would only be considered valid if Hugh supported Baldwin (and his heir, Philip of Courtenay) in recapturing Constantinople. If this were to not occur, it was agreed among the signatories that the title should be transferred to Charles I and his heirs.

House of Anjou (1274–1331)

Table of rival successions

References

Bibliography

Web sources 

 

Thessalonica